Don Williams Vol. III is the third album by American country singer Don Williams released in 1974 on the ABC/Dot label. The album reached number three in the US Country Albums Chart. The titles from this album can also be found on his Images or Greatest Hits Volume One albums. "I Wouldn't Want to Live if You Didn't Love Me" and "The Ties That Bind" were released as singles in North America in 1974, with the former becoming Williams' first number one country radio hit.

Track listing
All tracks composed by Don Williams, except where indicated.

Side one

"I Wouldn't Want to Live If You Didn't Love Me" (Al Turney) - 2:57
"Fly Away" - 2:07
"Ghost Story" (Joe Allen) - 2:41
"Goodbye Really Isn't Good at All" - 2:57
"Such a Lovely Lady" - 2:35

Side two

"The Ties That Bind" (Vin Corso, Clyde Otis) - 2:36
"When Will I Ever Learn" (Jim Rushing, Wayland Holyfield) - 2:53
"Why Lord Goodbye" - 2:14
"I've Turned You to Stone" (Jim Rushing) - 3:08
"Lovin' Understandin' Man" (Jim Rushing) - 2:47

Personnel
Joe Allen - bass
Jimmy Colvard - electric guitar
Lloyd Green - steel and Dobro
Shane Keister - keyboard and Moog
Kenny Malone - drums and marimba
Tommy Smith - trumpet
Buddy Spicher - fiddle
Don Williams and Jimmy Colvard - acoustic guitars
Don Williams - lead vocals

Production
Producer - Don Williams
Engineer - Ronnie Dean
Recorded at Jack Clement Recording Studios, Studio B, Nashville, Tennessee.

References

1974 albums
Don Williams albums
ABC Records albums
Dot Records albums